Afghanistan competed at the 1948 Summer Olympics in London, sending a total of 31 competitors, which consisted of the men's field hockey and football teams. This is the highest number of athletes that Afghanistan has ever sent to a Summer Olympic Games.

Afghanistan's football tournament began on 26 July at Brighton's Goldstone Ground with a preliminary round match against Luxembourg, with Afghanistan being defeated by six goals to none. This resulted in Afghanistan's failure to qualify to the first round of the tournament.

Out of three group stage matches, Afghanistan's field hockey team won 1 match, drew 1 match and lost 1 match, resulting in placing third of four competing teams, with a sum of 3 points. Afghanistan began their first of three group stage matches on 3 August, which ended in a 2–0 win for the country. However, in their final group match, Afghanistan faced Great Britain, who were playing on home ground, Afghanistan lost by 8 goals, scoring no goals themselves. Afghanistan then finished its second match on 5 August, against Switzerland, which ended as a draw (1 goal to each team). Therefore, Afghanistan did not proceed to the semi-finals, finishing third in Group B.

Field hockey

Men's tournament

Head coach: ?

Group B

Football

Squad
Head coach: ?

Match

References

See also 

 Afghanistan at the Olympics
 Sport in Afghanistan

Nations at the 1948 Summer Olympics
1948
1948 in Afghan sport